Melaleuca nesophila, commonly known as showy honey-myrtle, mindiyed or pink melaleuca, is a plant in the myrtle family, Myrtaceae and is endemic to an area near Albany in Western Australia. The Noongar name for the plant is mindiyet. Hardy and adaptable, with a dense crown of leaves and prolific heads of pink or purple flowers in late spring and summer, it is one of the most commonly cultivated melaleuca shrubs.

Description
It has greyish-white, papery bark and a dense crown which often reaches to the ground.

The lavender to rose pink "pom-pom" flowers appear over a long period from spring to mid-summer. The flowers are arranged in heads or short spikes on the ends of branches which continue to grow after flowering and sometimes also in the upper leaf axils.

Taxonomy and naming
Melaleuca nesophila was first formally described in 1862 by Ferdinand von Mueller in Fragmenta Phytographiae Australiae from a specimen collected on the rocks of the Doubtful Islands near Bremer Bay by Augustus Oldfield. The specific epithet (nesophila) is derived from the ancient Greek words  meaning "island" and  meaning "to love", referring to the location of the type specimen.

Distribution and habitat
Melaleuca nesophila occurs in the Gairdner River and East Mount Barren districts as well as nearby offshore islands, in the Esperance Plains biogeographic region. It grows in sand near quartzite rocks, usually in dense scrub.

Ecology
This species is naturalised in some parts of Victoria where it is considered a serious environmental weed because it replaces indigenous vegetation.

Conservation
This species is classified as "not threatened" by the Government of Western Australia Department of Parks and Wildlife.

Use in horticulture
Melaleuca nesophila is cultivated as an ornamental plant by plant nurseries, for use in gardens and drought tolerant landscaping.  It is planted as a flowering shrub, or with training, as a small ornamental tree. It grows in full sun to part shade, in sandy or clay loam soils. Once established, it will tolerate extended dry periods as well as coastal conditions.

References

nesophila
Myrtales of Australia
Drought-tolerant plants
Drought-tolerant trees
Endemic flora of Australia
Garden plants of Australia
Ornamental trees
Plants described in 1862
Rosids of Western Australia
Endemic flora of Western Australia
Taxa named by Ferdinand von Mueller